Erebus sumatrensis is a moth of the family Erebidae. It is found on Sumatra.

References

Moths described in 1913
Erebus (moth)